Buena Vista Township may refer to:

 Buena Vista Township, Schuyler County, Illinois
 Buena Vista Township, Clayton County, Iowa
 Buena Vista Charter Township, Michigan
 Buena Vista Township, New Jersey

Township name disambiguation pages